The Devil Track River is an  river in northeastern Minnesota, the United States. It begins at the outlet of Devil Track Lake and flows southeast to Lake Superior east of Croftville.

Devil Track River is a loose translation of the Ojibwe-language name.

See also
 List of rivers of Minnesota

References

 Minnesota Watersheds
 USGS Hydrologic Unit Map — State of Minnesota (1974)

Rivers of Minnesota
Tributaries of Lake Superior
Rivers of Cook County, Minnesota
Northern Minnesota trout streams